Homefront is a 2012 six-part drama that aired on ITV. The series follows the wives of British soldiers in Afghanistan.

Cast
Claire Skinner as Claire Marshbrook 
Clare Higgins as Paula Raveley 
Nicola Stephenson as Louise Mancetta 
Antonia Thomas as Tasha Raveley 
Warren Brown as Joe Mancetta 
George Costigan as Sgt Howard Raveley 
Rosie Day as Millie Bartham 
Dean Anthony Fagan as Adam Smeeton 
Daniel Francis as Sgt Carl Haleford 
Mackinley Guest as Hannah Mancetta 
Carla Henry as Julie Desford

References

External links

2012 British television series debuts
2012 British television series endings
2010s British drama television series
2010s British television miniseries
ITV television dramas
British military television series
Television series by ITV Studios
English-language television shows
Television shows set in Cheshire